The 2008–09 USHL season is the 30th season of the United States Hockey League as an all-junior league. The regular season began on October 3, 2008, and concluded on April 5, 2009, with the regular season champion winning the Anderson Cup. The 2008–09 season was the first for the expansion Fargo Force, replacing the Ohio Junior Blue Jackets who folded after only two seasons in existence.

The Clark Cup playoffs featured the top four teams from each division competing for the league title.

Regular season
Final Standings

Note: GP = Games played; W = Wins; L = Losses; OTL = Overtime losses; SL = Shootout losses; GF = Goals for; GA = Goals against; PTS = Points; x = clinched playoff berth; y = clinched division title; z = clinched league title

East Division

West Division

Clark Cup Playoffs

Players

Scoring Leaders

Leading Goaltenders

Awards
Coach of the Year: Dean Blais Fargo Force
Curt Hammer Award: Mike Walsh Chicago Steel
Defenseman of the Year: John Moore Chicago Steel
Executive of the Year: Jim Pflug Lincoln Stars
Forward of the Year: Andrew Miller Chicago Steel
General Manager of the Year: Jon Cooper Green Bay Gamblers
Goaltender of the Year: Mike Lee Fargo Force
Organization of the Year: Fargo Force
Player of the Year: Andrew Miller Chicago Steel
Rookie of the Year: Louis Leblanc Omaha Lancers
Scholar-Athlete of the Year: Jeff Teglia Omaha Lancers

First Team All-Stars
 Brett Bennett (Goalie) Indiana Ice
 John Moore (Defense) Chicago Steel
 Matt Donovan (Defense) Cedar Rapids RoughRiders
 Andrew Miller (Forward) Chicago Steel
 Craig Smith (Forward) Waterloo Black Hawks

Second Team All-Stars
 Kevin Murdock (Goalie) Lincoln Stars
 Jake Newton (Defense) Lincoln Stars
 David Makowski (Defense) Green Bay Gamblers
 Stephane Da Costa (Forward) Sioux City Musketeers
 Mike Seidel (Forward) Cedar Rapids RoughRiders
 Anthony Taranto (Forward) Fargo Force

References

External links
 Official website of the United States Hockey League

USHL
United States Hockey League seasons